Suluiyeh may refer to:
 Suluiyeh, Rudbar-e Jonubi (سولوييه - Sūlū’īyeh)